State Route 140 (SR 140) is an east–west state highway in the southern portion of the U.S. state of Ohio. The highway has its western terminus in Portsmouth at a diamond interchange with U.S. Route 52.

State Route 140 first appeared in the mid-1920s.  The two-lane highway passes through three counties along its path: Scioto, Lawrence and Jackson.  It begins at an interchange with U.S. Route 52 and, immediately following the interchange, leaves the Portsmouth corporation limits and heads east.  The route makes a quick hilly climb upward and downward to the former Teays River Valley near Slocum; it then traverses primarily wooded areas as it passes through Ashley Corner, Scioto Furnace, South Webster, and Eifort.  It retains the forested area up until its eastern terminus.  For most of its alignment, State Route 140 parallels an abandoned Baltimore and Ohio Railroad line.

Route description
Along its way, State Route 140 travels through eastern Scioto County, clips the northwestern corner of Lawrence County and then sneaks into southern Jackson County.  State Route 140 is not a part of the  National Highway System, a system of highways deemed most important for the nation's economy, mobility and defense.

History
State Route 140 was established in 1923.  The original routing of the highway is the one which it still utilizes to this day through Scioto, Lawrence and Jackson Counties.  The highway has not experienced any major changes since its inception, excepting the highways that it intersects at its endpoints.  Its western terminus, which is now U.S. Route 52, was originally a part of State Route 7.  Meanwhile, its eastern terminus, which is currently State Route 93, was originally designated as State Route 75.

Major intersections

References

External links

140
Transportation in Scioto County, Ohio
Transportation in Lawrence County, Ohio
Transportation in Jackson County, Ohio